Danny Fulton (born September 2, 1956) is a former American football wide receiver. He played for the Buffalo Bills in 1979 and for the Cleveland Browns from 1981 to 1982.

References

1956 births
Living people
American football wide receivers
Nebraska Cornhuskers football players
Nebraska–Omaha Mavericks football players
Buffalo Bills players
Cleveland Browns players